Hannah and John Edward Peck were an American married couple that were poisoned with arsenic by their son-in-law Arthur Warren Waite in 1916.

The murders
Arthur Warren Waite married Clara Louise Peck, the daughter of Hannah M. Peck (nee Carpenter) and John Edward Peck on September 9, 1915, in Grand Rapids, Michigan. Hannah Peck was poisoned with arsenic and died on January 30, 1916, at the home of Waite and his wife and the victim's daughter Clara Peck. John Peck travelled from Grand Rapids, Michigan to Manhattan, New York City and he died on March 21, 1916.  Waite poisoned him during a dental exam and gave him additional arsenic in his food. When the death was too slow he gave him ether and smothered him with a pillow. 

Waite was found guilty and sentenced to death via electrocution at Sing Sing on May 24, 1917.

Perpetrator

Arthur Warren Waite (December 2, 1887 – May 24, 1917)  He was born in Grand Rapids, Michigan to Warren W. Wait and Sarah Jane Haines. He claimed to be a physician and took a course in dentistry at the University of Michigan and then studied at the University of Glasgow. Subsequently, despite the fact that he was listed in directories as "Dr. Waite", he was never a registered physician, nor practiced dentistry.

Victims
John Edward Peck (March 4, 1844 – March 21, 1916) He was born in Newburg, New York, to Elias Peck and Catherine Millard.  He married Hannah M. Carpenter in 1876. He died at 435 Riverside Drive in Manhattan, New York City at the home of Arthur. He founded Peck Brothers Drug Co. with his brother Thomas M. Peck and sold it for several million dollars. He was a director of several banks and held stocks in Furniture companies.  

Hannah M. Carpenter Peck (April 24, 1854 – January 30, 1916) was born in New York City. She married John Edward Peck. She was poisoned by Arthur Warren Waite.

Family of victims
Percy Seaman Peck (1878–1974) was the son of Hannah and John Edward Peck. He testified at the murder trial of Arthur Warren Waite.

Waite's wife
Clara Louise Peck Waite (1887–1964) was the daughter of Hannah and John Edward Peck, and the wife of Arthur Warren Waite.  She was poisoned, and became ill, but recovered. She later married John J. Caulfield (1883–1952).

Margaret Horton
Margaret Horton was a cabaret singer who was having an affair with the married Arthur Warren Waite.

References

1916 murders in the United States
Murder in New Jersey
Peck, Hannah M. Carpenter
Peck, John Edward
American murder victims
Deaths by poisoning
1916 in New Jersey